Clytoderus pygmaeus is a species of beetle in the family Cerambycidae, the only species in the genus Clytoderus.

References

Anaglyptini